The 2005 Kentucky Derby was the 131st running of the Kentucky Derby. The race took place on May 7, 2005 and was won by Giacomo, a longshot at odds of 50–1. Another longshot, Closing Argument, finished second, resulting in an exacta payout of $9,814.80. A crowd of 156,435 was in attendance.

Contenders
The 5-2 favorite for the race was Bellamy Road, winner of the Wood Memorial Stakes. Afleet Alex was the second choice based on his win in the Arkansas Derby. Other leading contenders included Wilko (Breeders' Cup Juvenile), High Fly (Florida Derby) and Bandini (Blue Grass Stakes). Giacomo, whose only win was in a maiden race at age two, was one of the longest shots in the field at 50–1. He had finished fourth in the Santa Anita Derby in his previous start.

Results
Spanish Chestnut went to the early lead and set fast opening fractions of 22.28 seconds for the first quarter-mile and 45.38 for the half. Closing Argument sat a few lengths behind and gradually improved his position, taking the lead in mid stretch. Meanwhile, Giacomo broke slowly and settled near the back of the field, carried five wide around the first turn. Still in 18th place after three-quarters of a mile, Giacomo started to make up ground while moving six wide around the turn. He ran into traffic problems entering the stretch but finally found racing room and closed steadily to win by half a length.

"He had to overcome some pretty tricky moves. In the first turn, he got carried out. I had to ease him back, jump heels, save all I could save", said jockey Mike Smith. "Then I saw a little seam turning for home. I got him to the outside, and he just kept grinding and grinding and wouldn't stop until he got it."

It was the first Derby win for all of Giacomo's connections: jockey Smith, trainer John Shirreffs and owners Jerry and Ann Moss. The payout on Giacomo was $102.60 for a $2 bet, at the time the second highest payout in Derby history to Donerail in 1913.

Track condition: Fast

Times:  mile – 22.28;  mile – 45.38;  mile – 1:09.59; mile – 1:35.88; final – 2:02.75.
Splits for each quarter-mile: (22.28) (23.10) (24.21) (26.29) (26.87)

Source: Equibase Chart

Payout
The 131st Kentucky Derby Payout Schedule

 $2 Exacta: (10-18)  Paid   $9,814.80
 $2 Trifecta: (10-18-12)  Paid   $133,134.80
 $1 Superfecta: (10-18-12-17)   Paid $864,253.50

Subsequent racing careers
Giacomo's only win after the Derby was in the Grade II San Diego Handicap. Two horses went on to record Grade I wins:
 Afleet Alex – Preakness Stakes, Belmont Stakes
 Flower Alley – Travers Stakes

Subsequent breeding careers
Sires of Classic winners

Flower Alley
 I'll Have Another – 2012 Kentucky Derby, Preakness Stakes, Santa Anita Derby
 Lilacs and Lace – 2011 Ashland Stakes
 Bullards Alley – 2017 Canadian International

Sires of Grade I winners
Afleet Alex
 Afleet Express – 2010 Travers Stakes
 Dublin – 2009 Hopeful Stakes
 Iotapa – 2014 Vanity Stakes, Clement L. Hirsch Stakes
 Materiality – 2015 Florida Derby
 Texas Red – 2014 Breeders' Cup Juvenile

Bellamy Road
 Diversify – 2017 Jockey Club Gold Cup, 2018 Whitney Stakes
 Toby's Corner – 2011 Wood Memorial

Sources: American Classic Pedigrees, Equibase, Blood-Horse Stallion Register, Racing Post

References

2005
Kentucky Derby
Derby
May 2005 sports events in the United States